The men's artistic individual all-around competition at the 2018 Asian Games will be held on 20 August 2018 at the Jakarta International Expo Hall D2. Because of the maximum of 2 players per country rule, the other gymnasts listing are not given a ranking.

Schedule
All times are Western Indonesia Time (UTC+07:00)

Results 
Legend
DNF — Did not finish
DNS — Did not start

References

External links
Results

Artistic Men's artistic individual all-around